The 1996 European Road Championships were held in Isle of Man, Great Britain, in mid June 1996. Regulated by the European Cycling Union. The event consisted of a road race for men and women under 23.

Schedule

Road race 

Tuesday 18 June 1996
 Women U23

 
 Men U23

Events summary

Medal table

References

External links
The European Cycling Union

European Road Championships, 1996
European Road Championships by year
International cycle races hosted by the United Kingdom
1996 in British sport
Cycle races in the Isle of Man
Euro